The 2023 WDF World Darts Championship (officially referred to as the 2023 Lakeside World Darts Championship) will be the 2nd edition of the WDF World Darts Championship organised by the World Darts Federation (WDF). The tournament will be held at the Lakeside Country Club in Frimley Green, Surrey, England.

Neil Duff and Beau Greaves will be defending seniors titles.

Men's

Format and qualifiers
Qualifying criteria are as follows.

 Top 16 players in WDF World Rankings (seeded)
 Winners of the 12 Platinum/Gold ranked tournaments
 First and second ranked players from each of seven regional tables
 Next highest ranked players in the WDF World Rankings to bring the total entry list to 44
 Four qualifiers from the final qualification tournament in Assen, Netherlands on 12 December 2022

Seeded players begin the competition in the second round. The remaining 32 qualifiers will start in the first round. The provisional list of seeds and invited players is as follows.

1–16 in WDF RankingsSeeded in second round
 
 
 
 
 
 
 
 
 
 
 
 
 
 
 
 

Ranked Tournaments WinnersFirst round
  – 2022 Denmark Open
  – 2022 British Open
  – 2022 Isle of Man Open
  – 2022 Australian Open

  – 2022 Dutch Open, 2022 Irish Open
  – 2022 World Championship
  – 2022 Scottish Open
  – 2022 World Masters
  – 2022 New Zealand Open
 

Regional Table QualifiersFirst round
  – Australia
  – North Europe
  – North Europe
  – Eastern Europe
  – Eastern Europe
  – USA

  – Australia
  – New Zealand
  – New Zealand
  – UK & Ireland
  – UK & Ireland
  – USA
  – West Europe
  – West Europe
 

WDF Rankings QualifiersFirst round
 
 
 
 
 
 
 
 
 
 
 
 
 
 
 

Assen QualifiersFirst round
 
 
 
 

ReservesFirst round

Women's

Format and qualifiers
Qualifying criteria is as follows.

 Top 8 players in WDF World Rankings (seeded)
 Winners of the 12 Platinum/Gold ranked tournaments
 First and second ranked players from each of seven regional tables
 Next highest ranked players in the WDF World Rankings to bring the total entry list to 22
 Two qualifiers from the final qualification tournament in Assen, Netherlands on 12 December 2022

Seeded players begin the competition in the second round. The remaining 16 qualifiers will start in the first round. The provisional list of seeds and invited players is as follows.

1–8 in WDF RankingsSeeded in Second round
 
 
 
 
 
 
 
 

Ranking Tournaments WinnersFirst round
  – 2022 New Zealand Open

  – 2022 World Championship, 2022 Dutch Open, 2022 Isle of Man Open, 2022 Welsh Open, 2022 Australian Open, 2022 England Classic, 2022 Irish Open, 2022 World Masters
  – 2022 Scottish Open, 2022 Denmark Open
  – 2022 British Open
 

Regional Table QualifiersFirst round
  – North Europe
  – Eastern Europe
  – Australia
  – USA
  – Western Europe

  – UK & Ireland
  – New Zealand
 

WDF Rankings QualifiersFirst round
 
 
 
 
 
 
 
 

Assen QualifiersFirst round

Boys'

Format and qualifiers
All boys under the age of 18 are eligible to play in the 2023 Lakeside WDF Boys World Championship tournament. The semi-finals and final of the tournament are played at the Lakeside Country Club, Frimley Green as a part of the 2023 WDF World Darts Championships tournament. List of qualified players is as follows.

Girls'

Format and qualifiers
All girls that will be under the age of 18 shall be eligible to play in the 2023 Lakeside WDF Girls World Championship tournament. The final of the tournament shall be played at the Lakeside Country Club, Frimley Green as a part of the 2023 WDF World Darts Championships tournament. List of qualified players is as follows.

References

External links

World Darts Championship
World Darts Championship
World Darts Championship
World Darts Championship
WDF World Darts Championships
WDF World Darts